Platte Township is one of ten townships in Andrew County, Missouri, United States. As of the 2010 census, its population was 426.

Platte Township was established in 1846, and named after the Platte River.

Geography

The streams of Clear Creek and Hickory Creek run through this township.

Transportation
Platte Township contains two airports: Fairbanks Airport and Hannah Airport.

References

 USGS Geographic Names Information System (GNIS)

External links
 US-Counties.com
 City-Data.com

Townships in Andrew County, Missouri
Townships in Missouri